The 75mm Pack Howitzer M1 (redesignated the M116 in 1962) was a pack howitzer artillery piece used by the United States. Designed to be moved across difficult terrain, gun and carriage could be broken down into several pieces to be carried by pack animals. 

The gun saw combat in World War II with the United States Army (primarily used by airborne units), with the United States Marine Corps, and was also supplied to foreign forces.

In addition to the pack / air portable configuration, the gun was mounted on a conventional carriage to serve as a field artillery piece. The M2 and M3 are derived vehicle-mounted howitzers used in the 75mm HMC M8 and some LVT models. In addition, the M1 in its original version was mated to a number of other self-propelled carriages, though only one of those – 75mm HMC T30 – reached mass production.

Development and production
The 75 mm pack howitzer was designed in the United States in the 1920s to meet a need for an artillery piece that could be moved across difficult terrain. Development began in 1920, and in August 1927, the weapon was standardized as Howitzer, Pack, 75mm M1 on Carriage M1. Due to meager funding, production rates were very low; by 1933, only 32 guns had been manufactured, and by 1940, only 91 pieces. It was not until September 1940 that the howitzer was put into mass production. By then, the M1 had been succeeded by the slightly modified M1A1. Production continued until December 1944.

The only significant changes during the mass production period were carriage improvements. The original carriage M1 was of box trail type, with wooden wheels. The requirement for a lightweight howitzer for airborne troops led to the introduction of the M8 carriage, similar except for new wheels with pneumatic tires.

Another requirement, from the cavalry branch of the US Army, resulted in a completely different family of "field howitzer" split trail carriages M3A1 / M3A2 / M3A3. However, only limited numbers of the M1 field howitzer variant were built, due to cavalry's switch to self-propelled guns.

Description
The howitzer M1 or M1A1 consisted of tube and breech, which were joined together by interrupted threads, allowing for quick assembly and disassembly. One eighth of a turn was required to connect or disconnect tube and breech. The tube had uniform, right hand rifling with one turn in 20 calibers. The breech was of horizontal sliding-block type, with continuous-pull firing mechanism.

The recoil system was Hydro-pneumatic. Both recoil buffer and recuperator were located under the barrel.

The pack howitzer carriage M1 had dismantling construction. The carriage was of box trail type, with steel-rimmed wooden wheels. For transportation, the howitzer M1 or M1A1 on carriage M1 could be broken down into six mule loads, with payload weight between 73 and 107 kg each:
Tube
Breech and wheels
Top sleigh and cradle
Bottom sleigh and recoil mechanism
Front trail
Rear trail and axle.

The carriage M8 was identical, except for axle arms and wheels, which were metal with pneumatic tires. The howitzer on carriage M8 could be broken down into seven mule loads or into nine parachute loads (the latter arrangement included 18 rounds of ammunition). It could also be towed by vehicle such as 1/4 ton jeep, or transported by plane or glider such as CG-4 Waco.

The field howitzer carriages of the M3 family were non-dismantling, split trail. All these were fitted with metal wheels with pneumatic tires; all had an additional retractable support, referred to as a firing base. In firing position, the firing base could be lowered and wheels raised, leaving the weapon to rest on the firing base and trails.

Organization and service

US military

In the Second World War era US Army, 75 mm howitzers were issued to airborne and mountain units.

An airborne division, according to the organization of February 1944, had three 75 mm howitzer battalions – two glider field artillery battalions (two six-gun batteries each) and one parachute field artillery battalion (three four-gun batteries), in total 36 pieces per division. In December 1944, new Tables of Organization and Equipment increased the divisional firepower to 60 75 mm howitzers (as an option, in glider battalions 75 mm pieces could be replaced with more powerful 105mm M3).

The only mountain division formed, the 10th, had three 75 mm howitzer battalions, 12 pieces each. The gun was also used by some separate field artillery battalions. These included mule-packed field artillery battalions seeing service in Burma.

The M1A1 also saw use during the Battle of Anzio, 39th Field Artillery Regiment.

In the US Marine Corps, under the E-series Tables of Organization (TO) from 15 April 1943 divisional artillery included three 75 mm howitzer battalions, 12 pieces each. The F-series TO from 5 May 1944 reduced the number of 75 mm battalions to two, and the G-series TO removed them altogether, completing the shift to 105 mm and 155 mm howitzers. Although the G-series TO was only adopted on 4 September 1945, in practice in some divisions the change was introduced early in 1945.

The M116 is still used by the US military for ceremonial purposes as a salute gun firing blanks.

Other operators

Two major lend lease recipients of the M1 were United Kingdom (826 pack howitzers) and China (637 pack howitzers and 125 field howitzers). 68 pieces were supplied to France, and 60 to various countries in Latin America.

In the British service, the howitzer was issued to two mountain artillery regiments, two airlanding light artillery regiments, raiding support regiment and was temporarily used by some other units. The gun remained in British service until the late 1950s.

The 75 mm howitzer was also used by Australian forces – two mountain batteries and some other units.

A single howitzer was airdropped in April 1945 to the 2nd (Italian) SAS Regiment, a special force coordinated by Major Roy Farran and composed of partisans with mixed political allegiances, Russian ex-prisoners-of-war, and Wehrmacht deserters. Baptized "Molto Stanco" ("Very tired" in Italian), the gun was used in the course of Operation Tombola to harass enemy convoys driving up and down along Route 12 between Modena and Florence. On 21 April 1945, the howitzer was towed by means of a Willys Jeep to the outskirts of Reggio Emilia, from where the Italian gunners initiated a shelling of the city that wrought panic among Axis troops. Believing that the arrival of Allied forces was imminent, the Germans and their fascist allies evacuated the city.

In China after the loss of the mainland, guns left behind were both used by the People's Liberation Army and exported to the Viet Minh. There is record of these guns being used at the Siege of Dien Bien Phu and, presumably, in later conflicts. The type also remained in use with the Republic of China Army's outlying island garrisons (as coastal artillery) as well as mountain troops.

153 M116s were supplied to Japan (Japan Ground Self-Defense Force) and they were used until the 1980s. The Croatian Army fields M116 howitzers as ceremonial cannon, 12 of which are still kept in service for that purpose; an additional 45 guns have been retired and are no longer utilized by the army, some being stored in local army museums. 

In 2010 the M116 75 mm pack howitzer was used by the Turkish Army in operations against Kurdish separatists in southeastern Turkey.

The howitzers have been used for avalanche control at several western US ski areas.

Three howitzers are used by Norwich University's Norwich Artillery Battery, along with a Civil War-era cannon used for ceremonies. The howitzers are used in field training exercises for both the Battery and the school's Ranger Company and the Corps of Cadets, as well as school traditions, such as at football game kickoffs. The University of North Georgia, one of six senior military colleges also utilizes a pack howitzer at the base of their drill field. The piece is fired daily during reveille, retreat and during any special ceremonies honoring military graduates or active duty personnel.

Variants

Howitzer variants:
M1920, M1922A, M1922B, M1923B, M1923E1, M1923E2 – prototypes.
M1 – the first standardized variant. Based on M1923E2 with minor changes.
M1A1 – variant with modified breech block and breech ring.
M2 – vehicle mounted variant. Tube and breech from M1A1 were used. In order to provide a cylindrical recoil surface, the tube was fitted with an external sleeve. 197 built.
M3 – vehicle mounted variant; like M2 but with recoil surface as a part of the tube. The M2 and M3 barrels were interchangeable.
M116 – post-war designation of the complete weapon.
M120 – post-war designation for saluting howitzers
Carriage variants:
M1 – dismantling box trail carriage with wooden wheels.
M2A1, T2, T2E1, T2E2, T2E3 – experimental carriages.
M3A1 – split-trail carriage with firing base and pneumatic tires.
M3A2 – M3A1 with shield added.
M3A3 – M3A2 with different wheels and combat tires.
M8 – M1 with new wheels with pneumatic tires.

Self-propelled mounts

Two nearly identical vehicle mounted variants – M2 and M3 – were developed based on tube and breech of the M1A1, for use in the 75mm Howitzer Motor Carriage T47 / M8. Both variants had a cylindrical "recoil surface" around the tube. In the M2, the surface was provided by use of a separately manufactured sleeve, while in the M3 it became an integral part of the barrel. M2 and M3 were fully interchangeable. These guns were mounted on the below armored vehicles:

75mm Howitzer Motor Carriage T47 / M8 – M2 / M3 in mount M7.
Landing Vehicle Tracked (A)-4 – M3 in mount M7.
Landing Vehicle Tracked (A)-5 – M3 in mount M12.

In addition, M1 / M1A1 was mated to a number of other vehicles. Only the T30 reached mass production.

Medium Tank T5E2 – M1A1.
Experimental mount on Holt light tractor.
75mm Howitzer Motor Carriage T1 (Tank development chassis T2).
75mm Howitzer Motor Carriage T3 (Combat Car M1 chassis).
75mm Howitzer Motor Carriage T17 (Combat Car M1E3 chassis).
75mm Howitzer Motor Carriage T18 (Light Tank M3 chassis) – M1A1.
75mm Howitzer Motor Carriage T30 – M1A1 in mount T10.
75mm Howitzer Motor Carriage T41 (Light Tank M5 chassis).

Ammunition
The gun fired fixed (HEAT M66) and semi-fixed ammunition, fitted with 75mm Cartridge Case M5A1 (type II) and (type I) accordingly. The propellant charge of semi-fixed ammunition consisted of base charge and three increments, forming four different charges, from 1 (the smallest) to 4 (the largest).

HEAT M66 Shell penetrated about 91 mm of homogeneous armor at 0 degrees at any range. While the powder charge was different, this gun fired the same types of shell projectiles as used in the 75mm Tank Guns of WWII, which were themselves derived from the 75×350 mm R ammunition of the French 75mm field gun of WWI.

† - The blank likely existed as M337, M337A and M337A1 based on US Army model numbering convention.

Users 
  Brazil
  People's Republic of China - captured from Nationalist forces during the Chinese Civil War.
  Croatia - 12 are kept in active service primarily as ceremonial cannons.
 
 
 
  - supplied to the Royal Lao Army during the First Indochina War and used during the Laotian Civil War.
 
 
  Republic of China - supplied to Nationalist forces during World War 2 and used during the Chinese Civil War.
 : A total of 24 M1s were supplied to the Army in August 1950.
 
 
 
  Republic Of Vietnam - ARVN used this howitzer during the Vietnam war. Some of them were captured by Northern Vietnamese Forces.
 : Viet Minh and People's Army of Vietnam

See also
 Skoda 75 mm Model 1928
 7.5 cm KwK 37, the closest WW II German vehicular-mount equivalent to the M2 and M3 versions
 List of U.S. Army weapons by supply catalog designation SNL C-20
 Artillery observer

Notes

References

Sources

External links

 The Old Army Mules Takes Guns Where Wheels Don't Go May 1941 Popular Science
 "Airplane Moves Artillery 120 Miles In An Hour", June 1931, Popular Science air transport of early version of M116 Howitzer

World War II mountain artillery
World War II artillery of the United States
World War II artillery of the United Kingdom
75 mm artillery
Pack artillery
 Military equipment introduced in the 1920s